Île Marc is one of the Canadian arctic islands in Nunavut, Canada. It lies in the Boyer Strait, south of Massey Island, and north-west of Alexander Island.

"Ile Marc" is named to honour Marc Boyer who served as deputy-minister of the federal department of Mines & Technical Surveys from 1950 until his premature death in 1962.

External links
 Île Marc in the Atlas of Canada - Toporama; Natural Resources Canada

Ile Vanier
Uninhabited islands of Qikiqtaaluk Region